may refer to:
Yuki Nakajima (born 1990), Japanese biathlete
Yuki Nakashima (voice actress) (born 1997), Japanese voice actress

See also
Yuki (given name)
Nakajima (surname)